Alcatraz is a shooter game created by 221B Software Developments and published by Infogrames. It was released for MS-DOS, Atari ST and Amiga in 1992, as a spiritual sequel to Infogrames' 1988 game Hostages.

Plot
Alcatraz Island, once home to America's most undesirable criminals, lies empty and abandoned. Since its closure, it was used as a tourist destination. Now, it is used by the notorious criminal Miguel Tardiez to use as the centre of his distribution network for his drug and gun running and money laundering operations.

Learning that Tardiez is on American soil, the US Navy SEALs dispatch their best operatives: Bird and Fist. Their mission: to covertly breach the disused prison, destroy the drug and weapons caches and apprehend Tardiez.

Landing on the beach, they fight their way through Tardiez's highly trained henchmen, using the shadows and hiding behind walls until they can silently breach the various buildings of the prison to look for the various caches, which they burn or blow up with C4 explosive or just by shooting them. Eventually, they reach Tardiez's office as he is just making his escape by helicopter and manage to kill Tardiez before he can evade capture.

Gameplay
The game takes place over a number of levels, which changes its perspective to adjust to the corresponding mission, i.e.: inside buildings to find drugs, money and weapon caches, the viewpoint adjusts to first person mode, whilst many levels adopt the familiar side-scrolling perspective in which the commandos may hide in shadows from the enemies. This also allows the player to change his weapons, which you pick up from the enemies you dispatch.

Reception
According to a review in Amiga Action, "many people will find the gameplay outdated and will soon become bored with it", whereas Amiga Computing was more positive, commenting: "as a whole, Alcatraz is an improvement on Hostages" and adding that "the scrolly shooty bits are absolutely brilliant" and the game's 3D sections "are not as good, but still fun".

Legacy
An unofficial remake of the game was published by City Interactive in 2010.

References

External links
Alcatraz  at Amia Hall of Light
Alcatraz at Atari Mania

1992 video games
Alcatraz Island in fiction
Amiga games
Atari ST games
DOS games
Video games about the illegal drug trade
Video games about the United States Navy SEALs
First-person shooters
Side-scrolling video games
Stealth video games
Video games developed in France
Video games set on islands